Egenäs is a small village in Årjäng Municipality, western Värmland, and located near Dalsland, Sweden.

Populated places in Värmland County
Populated places in Årjäng Municipality

sv:Egenäs